Granny Had No Worries is a 1935 Polish comedy film directed by Aleksander Ford and Michał Waszyński.

Cast
Barbara Gilewska ...  Basia Boczkówna 
Władysław Walter ...  Boczek 
Helena Zarembina ...  Boczek's wife 
Witold Zacharewicz ...  Janusz 
Michał Znicz ...  Tailor 
Ludwik Lawiński ...  Merchant 
Helena Buczyńska   
Tadeusz Fijewski   
Stanisław Sielański   
Irena Skwierczyńska   
Stefan Szczuka   
Michał Waszyński   
Halina Zawadzka

References

External links 
 

1935 films
1930s Polish-language films
Polish black-and-white films
Films directed by Michał Waszyński
Films directed by Aleksander Ford
1935 comedy films
Polish comedy films